The Southern Food and Beverage Museum is a non-profit museum based in New Orleans, Louisiana, with a mission to explore the culinary history of the American Southern states, to explain the roots of Southern food and drinks. Their exhibits focus on every aspect of food in the South, from the cultural traditions to the basic recipes and communities formed through food.

History 
The Museum was founded in 2004 by Matt Konigsmark, Gina Warner, and Elizabeth Williams, who is now President. It got its start through a small exhibit on the history and influences of beverages in New Orleans. With help from co-founders Elizabeth Pearce and a growing board of interested foodies from around the South, the exhibits grew. Pearce curated an exhibit based on the revival of restaurants in post-Hurricane Katrina New Orleans called Restaurant Restorative that was featured at the 2006 James Beard Foundation Awards. From there, it was only a matter of finding the proper space for a full-sized museum on food and beverages that would cover the entire South, not just New Orleans and Louisiana. In the summer of 2008, the Museum finally found a home in Riverwalk Marketplace, a shopping mall right on the Mississippi River in the Warehouse District of New Orleans.

On September 1, 2011, the Southern Food and Beverage Museum announced it will be relocating to a larger space on O. C. Haley Boulevard in historic Central City, New Orleans. The groundbreaking at Dryades Market building happened on June 25, 2012. The new facility opened on September 29, 2014. Plans for the new location include a full-service restaurant, a children's gallery, a culinary innovation center, and an exhibit for every southern state.

In May 2011 Southern Food and Beverage Museum was named one of the five great museums devoted to food by Saveur magazine.

Exhibits 
The Southern Food and Beverage Museum features a wide range of food and beverage related exhibits.

The Leah Chase Louisiana Gallery is a permanent gallery focused on the food and traditions of Louisiana. The gallery is named after New Orleans creole chef Leah Chase. Louisiana Eats! Laissez Faire – Savoir Fare, as the exhibit is called, covers everything from beignets to harvesting crawfish, to the evolution of jambalaya through colonial and native foods.

Bruning's Bar is a bar from the 1830s that is in the process of being restored. It was salvaged from the wreckage of Bruning's Restaurant, the third oldest restaurant in New Orleans, after Hurricane Katrina. The bar is also used as such during special events.

Events 
The Southern Food and Beverage Museum usually hosts events on weekends. The events range from cooking demonstrations to workshops on beer making or rum tasting.

The Museum also hosts children's culinary camps that teach kids how to cook and appreciate food. There are also lesson plans for teachers to use to teach history and culture through a culinary approach.

Publications 
Red Beans and Ricely Yours: The Museum reprinted Christopher Blake's 1982 cookbook in both 2005 and 2006. It is a collection of traditional recipes from New Orleans, beginning with Louis Armstrong's favorite, the classic red beans and rice.

Room in the Bowl: In partnership with the Culinary Trust of the International Association of Culinary Professionals (IACP), the Museum published this collection of essays and photographs examining the signature dish of Louisiana: a pot of gumbo.

On the Line is SoFab's online blog, with recipes and features by multiple contributors, all experts on food and food ways of the south. Liz Williams, museum director, writes the Bread and Butter feature, which focuses on her expertise in food law.

Other museums 
The Museum of the American Cocktail is housed in the Southern Food and Beverage Museum. It chronicles the extensive history of the cocktail in America and provides a wealth of information regarding the social and cultural impact of alcoholic beverages.

SoFAB's culinary library and archive 
In late October 2013, SoFAB opened a culinary library on O.C. Haley Boulevard, a short distance from where the new museum will be located. This research library is open to the public and houses over 10,000 volumes including cookbooks, magazines, and books about food history and food politics.

It is also home to a growing archival collection. The archive will be a resource for scholars examining the culture of the South and the role of food and beverages in cultural history.

The library and archive contain information about food from all over the world, not limited to the American South.

References

External links

Southern Food and Beverage Museum - official site

Museums in New Orleans
Cuisine of the Southern United States
Food museums in the United States
History museums in Louisiana
Drinks museums in the United States
Museums established in 2004
2004 establishments in Louisiana